Looking Ahead! is the second album by pianist Cecil Taylor, recorded for the Contemporary label in June 1958. The album features performances by Taylor with Buell Neidlinger, Denis Charles, and Earl Griffith.

Reception
The AllMusic review by Brian Olewnick states: "Looking Ahead! does just that while still keeping several toes in the tradition. It's an amazing document of a talent fairly straining at the reins, a meteor about to burst onto the jazz scene and render it forever changed... Looking Ahead! is a vital recording from the nascence of one of the towering geniuses of modern music and belongs in any jazz fan's collection".

The authors of The Penguin Guide to Jazz awarded the album 3½ stars, commenting: "the most pensive of Taylor's early recordings may be the best place to start in appreciating his music," and noting that "Toll" "embarks on a new journey towards his own territory."

Track listing
All compositions by Cecil Tayor except as indicated
 "Luyah! The Glorious Step" - 6:25
 "African Violets" (Griffith, Taylor) - 5:12
 "Of What" - 8:18
 "Wallering" - 5:22
 "Toll" - 7:38
 "Excursion on a Wobbly Rail" - 9:04
Recorded at Nola's Penthouse Studios, NYC, June 9, 1958

Personnel
Cecil Taylor - piano
Buell Neidlinger - bass
Denis Charles - drums
Earl Griffith - vibes

References

1959 albums
Cecil Taylor albums
Contemporary Records albums